The Dodge County Courthouse in Fremont, Nebraska, at 435 N. Park Ave., was built during 1917–18.  It was listed on the National Register of Historic Places in 1990.

The courthouse was designed by local architectural firm A.H. Dyer Co. in Classical Revival style.

References

External links

Courthouses in Nebraska
National Register of Historic Places in Dodge County, Nebraska
Neoclassical architecture in Nebraska
Government buildings completed in 1918